Kevin Baden Manser (16 February 1929 – 21 December 2001) was an Australian actor best known for his career as a Dalek operator in the early seasons of the British science-fiction television series Doctor Who.

He was born in Adelaide and worked for South Australian Engineering and Water Supply until 1957, when he emigrated to London to work as a stage manager. This led to later work as a theatrical and television actor. In 1969 he returned to Australia and continued to play small parts on television while becoming involved with Doctor Who conventions. He wrote his autobiography, The Memoirs of a Dalek, in 2001, after being diagnosed with the cancer that eventually resulted in his death at the end of that year.

Amongst his TV and film roles, included appearances in the TV mini-series Bodyline (1984) and The Dismissal (1983), the film The Year My Voice Broke (1987) and appearing as Australian prime-minister William McMahon in the mini-series Vietnam (1987).

Filmography

Film

Television

External links

Real Doctor Who Fan Obituary

1929 births
2001 deaths
Male actors from Adelaide
Australian emigrants to England
Australian male stage actors
Australian stunt performers
Australian male television actors
Deaths from cancer in New South Wales